The 2022 Malaysia Cup knockout stage will be played from 25 October to 26 November 2022, with 16 team to the knockout stage beginning with the Round 16 followed by the quarter-finals, semi-finals and the finals. This stage will be played in two legs except for the finals which is played once.

Schedule
The draw for the 2022 Malaysia Cup was held on 6 October 2022.

Format

Each tie in the knockout phase was played over two legs, apart from the final, with each team playing one leg at home. The team that scored more goals on aggregate over the two legs advanced to the next round. If the aggregate score was level, the away goals rule was applied, i.e. the team that scored more goals away from home over the two legs advanced. If away goals were also equal, then thirty minutes of extra time was played. The away goals rule was again applied after extra time, i.e. if there were goals scored during extra time and the aggregate score was still level, the visiting team advanced by virtue of more away goals scored. If no goals were scored during extra time, the tie was decided by penalty shoot-out. In the final, which was played as a single match, if scores were level at the end of normal time, extra time was played, followed by a penalty shoot-out if scores remained tied.

The mechanism of the draws for each round was as follows:
In the draw for the quarter-final, the four group winners were seeded, and the four group runners-up were unseeded. The seeded teams were drawn against the unseeded teams, with the seeded teams hosting the second leg. Teams from the same group or the same association could not be drawn against each other.
In the draws for the quarter-finals onwards, there were no seedings, and teams from the same group or the same association could be drawn against each other.

Bracket
The bracket was decided after the draw for the round of 16, which was held on 6 October 2022 at the MFL House in Kuala Lumpur.

Round of 16

The first legs were played on 26 and 27 October, and the second legs were played on 31 October and 1 November 2022.

|}

Matches

Sabah won 3–2 on aggregate.

Kelantan won 2–1 on aggregate.

Selangor won 3–0 on aggregate.

Kuching City won 4–3 on aggregate.

Johor Darul Ta'zim won 6–0 on aggregate.

Negeri Sembilan won 2–1 on aggregate.

Kuala Lumpur City won 4–0 on aggregate.

Terengganu won 9–3 on aggregate.

Quarter-finals

The first legs were played on 5 & 6 November, and the second legs were played on 11 & 12 November 2022.

|}

Matches

Sabah won 2–1 on aggregate.

Johor Darul Ta'zim won 8–0 on aggregate.

Selangor won 4–2 on aggregate.

Terengganu won 4–1 on aggregate.

Semi-finals

The first legs were played on 15 & 16 November, and the second legs were played on 20 & 21 November 2022.

|}

Matches

Johor Darul Ta'zim won 4–1 on aggregate.

Selangor won 3–2 on aggregate.

Final

The final will be played at the Bukit Jalil National Stadium in Kuala Lumpur, Malaysia on 26 November 2022.

Notes

References

Malaysia Cup knockout phase
Football cup competitions in Malaysia